The 2019 Colorado Springs mayoral election was held on April 2, 2019, to elect the Mayor of Colorado Springs, Colorado. The election was officially nonpartisan.

A runoff had been scheduled for May 21, 2019, but John Suthers received enough votes in the general election.

Incumbent mayor John Suthers won reelection to a second term.

Candidates
John Suthers, incumbent Republican mayor
Juliette Parker
John Pitchford
Lawrence Martinez, he was a candidate in the 2015 Colorado Springs mayoral election

Results

References

2019
2019 Colorado elections
2019 United States mayoral elections